Toros de Aragua is a Venezuelan professional basketball club based in Aragua. The club competes in the Liga Profesional de Baloncesto (LPB).

Notable former players
- Set a club record or won an individual award as a professional player.
- Played at least one official international match for his senior national team at any time.
  Kibwe Trim

External links
Official site 
Latin-Basket.com Team Page

Basketball teams in Venezuela